Inger Elisabeth Hansen (born 20 April 1950) is a Norwegian poet and translator.

Her poetry collection Trask was awarded the Brage Prize in 2003  and nominated for the Nordic Council's Literature Prize in 2004. An extensive selection of her poetry in Spanish will be published by Bartleby in 2010.

In addition to writing her own poetry she has translated Cesar Vallejo, Juan Gelman, Rosario Castellanos and other Spanish and Latin-American poets into Norwegian, as well as Maryam Azimi and Märta Tikkanen. She has also taught Spanish-language literature at the University of Oslo and served as president of the Norwegian Writers' Union from 1997 to 1999.

Awards 
Gyldendal's Endowment 1986
Aschehoug Prize 1994  
Dobloug Prize 1994 
Brage Prize 2003

Works

Poetry

Fiction

Essays

Children's books

References

External links 
 Inger Elisabeth Hansen at Aschehoug Agency's website

1950 births
Living people
20th-century Norwegian poets
Dobloug Prize winners
Translators to Norwegian
Norwegian women poets
21st-century Norwegian poets
20th-century Norwegian women writers
21st-century Norwegian women writers
Translators from Spanish